The 2001–02 NBA season was the Pistons' 61st season, the 54th in the National Basketball Association, and the 45th in the Detroit area. After missing the playoffs the previous season, the Pistons selected Rodney White from the University of Charlotte with the ninth pick in the 2001 NBA draft. During the off-season, the team acquired Clifford Robinson from the Phoenix Suns, and Jon Barry from the Sacramento Kings. Under new head coach Rick Carlisle, the Pistons won 14 of their first 20 games, but then suffered a 7-game losing streak in December as part of a 5-14 stretch to fall to 19-20. Unlike previous seasons during the 1990s, The Pistons would rebound from the tough stretch to win 15 of their next 18 games. 

After a 26–21 record at the All-Star break, the Pistons won 24 of their final 35 games, winning the Central Division with a 50–32 record -- the franchise's first Division title since the 1990 -- thanks to a 123–89 home victory over the Milwaukee Bucks on the final night of the season.

Ben Wallace averaged 7.6 points, 13.0 rebounds and 3.5 blocks per game, was named Defensive Player of the Year, was named to the All-NBA Third Team, and NBA All-Defensive First Team. In addition, Corliss Williamson averaged 13.6 points per game off the bench, and was named Sixth Man of the Year, while Carlisle was named Coach of the Year. Jerry Stackhouse led the team in scoring with 21.4 points and 5.3 assists per game, but was not selected for the All-Star Game, while Robinson provided the team with 14.6 points and 4.8 rebounds per game, and was named to the NBA All-Defensive Second Team, Chucky Atkins provided with 12.1 points per game, Barry contributed 9.0 points per game off the bench, and rookie center Željko Rebrača was selected to the NBA All-Rookie Second Team. Wallace also finished in tenth place in Most Valuable Player voting, and in second place in Most Improved Player voting.

In the Eastern Conference First Round of the playoffs, the Pistons would defeat the Toronto Raptors in five games, and advance to the second round for the first time since 1991. However, in the Eastern Conference Semi-finals, after winning Game 1 over the 3rd-seeded Boston Celtics, 96–84 in Detroit, the Pistons would lose the next four games, thus the series. Following the season, Stackhouse was traded to the Washington Wizards, while White was traded to the Denver Nuggets, and Dana Barros was released to free agency.

For the season, the Pistons changed the colors of their primary logo to their traditional color scheme of red, white and blue, and also changed their uniforms. The logo and uniforms both remained in use until 2005.

Draft picks

Roster

Regular season

Season standings

z - clinched division title
y - clinched division title
x - clinched playoff spot

Record vs. opponents

Game log

Playoffs

|- align="center" bgcolor="#ccffcc"
| 1
| April 21
| Toronto
| W 85–63
| Jerry Stackhouse (20)
| Ben Wallace (20)
| Jerry Stackhouse (4)
| The Palace of Auburn Hills22,076
| 1–0
|- align="center" bgcolor="#ccffcc"
| 2
| April 24
| Toronto
| W 96–91
| Jerry Stackhouse (31)
| Ben Wallace (15)
| three players tied (4)
| The Palace of Auburn Hills22,076
| 2–0
|- align="center" bgcolor="#ffcccc"
| 3
| April 27
| @ Toronto
| L 84–94
| Chucky Atkins (21)
| Ben Wallace (11)
| Jerry Stackhouse (4)
| Air Canada Centre20,138
| 2–1
|- align="center" bgcolor="#ffcccc"
| 4
| April 29
| @ Toronto
| L 83–89
| Chucky Atkins (20)
| Ben Wallace (12)
| Clifford Robinson (6)
| Air Canada Centre20,112
| 2–2
|- align="center" bgcolor="#ccffcc"
| 5
| May 2
| Toronto
| W 85–82
| Corliss Williamson (23)
| Ben Wallace (17)
| Jerry Stackhouse (7)
| The Palace of Auburn Hills22,076
| 3–2
|-

|- align="center" bgcolor="#ccffcc"
| 1
| May 5
| Boston
| W 96–84
| Clifford Robinson (30)
| Ben Wallace (12)
| Atkins, Stackhouse (8)
| The Palace of Auburn Hills20,252
| 1–0
|- align="center" bgcolor="#ffcccc"
| 2
| May 8
| Boston
| L 77–85
| Jerry Stackhouse (25)
| Ben Wallace (16)
| Chucky Atkins (4)
| The Palace of Auburn Hills22,076
| 1–1
|- align="center" bgcolor="#ffcccc"
| 3
| May 10
| @ Boston
| L 64–66
| Jerry Stackhouse (19)
| Ben Wallace (21)
| Clifford Robinson (5)
| FleetCenter18,624
| 1–2
|- align="center" bgcolor="#ffcccc"
| 4
| May 12
| @ Boston
| L 79–90
| Clifford Robinson (24)
| Ben Wallace (21)
| Damon Jones (9)
| FleetCenter18,624
| 1–3
|- align="center" bgcolor="#ffcccc"
| 5
| May 14
| Boston
| L 81–90
| Chucky Atkins (22)
| Ben Wallace (16)
| Robinson, Stackhouse (5)
| The Palace of Auburn Hills22,076
| 1–4
|-

Player statistics

Season

Playoffs

Awards and records
Ben Wallace, NBA Defensive Player of the Year Award
Corliss Williamson, NBA Sixth Man of the Year Award
Rick Carlisle, NBA Coach of the Year Award
Ben Wallace, All-NBA Third Team
Ben Wallace, NBA All-Defensive First Team
Clifford Robinson, NBA All-Defensive Second Team
Željko Rebrača, NBA All-Rookie Team 2nd Team

Transactions

References

See also
2001-02 NBA season

Detroit Pistons seasons
Detroit
Detroit
Detroit